Worship Volume One: I Stand For You is Tree63's fourth album. It features 5 new songs, 4 live recording off Tree63 songs, a cover of Matt Redman's Nothing But The Blood, new versions of "I Stand For You" and "Have You Way" and a live recording of John Newton's Amazing Grace.

Track listing
 "No Other"
 "Treasure" (Live)
 "I Will Never Be the Same"
 "Joy" (Live)
 "I Stand For You" (New Version)
 "All Over the World"
 "Lift"
 "Nothing But the Blood"
 "King" (Live)
 "Have Your Way" (New Version, original from 63)
 "Great Kindness"
 "Look What You've Done" (Live)
 "Amazing Grace" (Live)

References

2005 albums
Inpop Records albums
Tree63 albums